Sweet and Sour is a 1963 French-Italian comedy film directed by Jacques Baratier and starring Guy Bedos. The film was selected for screening as part of the Cannes Classics section at the 2016 Cannes Film Festival.

Cast

 Jean Babilée as Oscar
 Guy Bedos as Gerard
 Jean-Paul Belmondo as Raymond
 Claude Brasseur as Plumber
 Françoise Brion as Striptease Girl
 Sophie Daumier as Jackie
 Jacques Dufilho as Monsieur Alfonso
 Anna Karina as Ginette
 Jean-Pierre Marielle as Rakanowski
 Andréa Parisy as Striptease Girl
 François Périer as Legrand
 Jean Richard as Lepetit
 Simone Signoret as Genevieve
 Alexandra Stewart as Anna
 Roger Vadim as He
 Romolo Valli as Monsieur X.
 Monica Vitti as She
 Marina Vlady as Callgirl
 Élisabeth Wiener as Frederique
 Georges Wilson as Casimir
 Pascale Roberts as Spogliarella
 Macha Méril as The striptisist
 Tsilla Chelton

References

External links

Sweet and Sour at Le Film Guide

1963 films
1963 comedy films
Italian comedy films
1960s French-language films
French black-and-white films
Films directed by Jacques Baratier
1960s French films
1960s Italian films